Eulophia euglossa is a species of orchid native to the western coast of Africa, as well as the nations of Central African Republic and Ethiopia. It is a large sized, cool growing terrestrial found near rivers and has narrow, conical pseudobulbs. Its flowers average a size of 2.5 inches, and its common name, the Euglossa Eulophia, refers to its resemblance to a human tongue.

References

euglossa